Lindera is a genus of about 80–100 species of flowering plants in the family Lauraceae, mostly native to eastern Asia but with three species in eastern North America. The species are shrubs and small trees; common names include spicewood, spicebush, and Benjamin bush.

Name
The Latin name Lindera commemorates the Swedish doctor Johan Linder (1676-1724).

Description

Lindera are evergreen or deciduous trees or shrubs. The leaves are alternate, entire or three-lobed, and strongly spicy-aromatic. Lindera are dioecious, with male and female flowers on separate trees. The inflorescences are composed of 3 to 15 small flowers existing as pseudo-umbels. They are sessile or on short shoots. The flowers are from greenish to white, greenish-yellow, or yellowish, with six tepals arranged in a star shape. The male flowers have 9 to 15 fertile stamens; the innermost circle of stamens can be found at the base of the stamen glands. Usually the stamens are longer than the anthers, which in turn consist of two chambers and are directed inwards or sideways. The vestigial ovary is negligible or absent. The base of the flower is small and flat. The female flowers have a varying number of staminodes. Pollination is done by bees and other insects. Lindera fruit have a hypocarpium at the base of the fruit, which in some cases forms a cup that encloses the bottom part of the fruit. The fruit is a small red, purple or black drupe containing a single seed, dispersed mostly by birds. Many species reproduce vegetatively by stolons.

Ecology
The genus appears to be able to occupy widely different habitats as long as its requirements for water are met. Habitat fragmentation severely affects dioecious species like Lindera melissifolia (pondberry), because populations with plants of a single sex can only vegetatively reproduce. With significant habitat loss, plants become ever more isolated, lessening the likelihood that pollinators will travel from male to female plants.

Most are found on the bottoms and edges of shallow seasonal ponds in old dune fields, but in drier areas they occur in low riverine habitat.
Most Lindera colonies occur in light shade beneath a forest canopy, but a few grow in almost full sunlight.
In warmer areas they occur in bottomland hardwood forests.

The North American species of Lindera are relicts that originally were more common when the climate of North America was more humid and they are not so widespread geographically as in the past.

The hermit thrush has been identified as a dispersal agent of seeds of L. melissifolia.

Lindera species are used as food plants by the larvae of some Lepidoptera species including the engrailed and the spicebush swallowtail.

Selected species

Uses
The bark, twigs, and leaves of some species can be used to make tea. The berries have also sometimes been used. The young bark can be chewed to parch thirst.

References

 
Lauraceae genera
Dioecious plants